Nicola Madonna (born 31 October 1986) is an Italian footballer who plays as a midfielder.

Club career
Madonna and Daniel Bombardieri joined AlbinoLeffe in a joint-ownership bid for €100,000 each. AlbinoLeffe got full ownership from Atalanta by blind auction between club in June 2006, for €110,000 and €11,000 respectively. He played 81 games for AlbinoLeffe at Serie B, plus 3 more appearances at 2007-08 promotion playoffs.

In summer 2009 he was re-signed by Atalanta in joint-ownership bid for €550,000 (exchanged with Michael Cia and Dario Bergamelli for the same price) but after a poor half season, on 1 February 2010 loaned to Vicenza.

After this loan, Madonna returned to Atalanta, and played only 1 match in a whole season. In June 2011 Atalanta acquired Madonna outright for a peppercorn of €1,500 and sold Bergamelli, Cia and Karamoko Cissé for €500 each.  After this unsuccessful season with the Dea, he was moved to Spezia Calcio in July 2011, initially in temporary deal. At the end of season he was signed by co-ownership deal for €250,000. The co-ownership was renewed in 2013 and again in 2014.

On 11 October 2019 he joined Serie C club Giana Erminio until the end of the season.

Personal life
He is the son of Armando Madonna, head coach of AlbinoLeffe, Piacenza and Livorno.

References

External links
AIC profile (data by football.it) 

1986 births
Living people
People from Alzano Lombardo
Italian footballers
Association football midfielders
Serie A players
Serie B players
Serie C players
Virtus Bergamo Alzano Seriate 1909 players
Atalanta B.C. players
U.C. AlbinoLeffe players
L.R. Vicenza players
Spezia Calcio players
Como 1907 players
Calcio Padova players
A.S. Giana Erminio players
Sportspeople from the Province of Bergamo
Footballers from Lombardy